Pingasa alba is a moth of the family Geometridae first described by Charles Swinhoe in 1891. It is found in the Chinese provinces of Hubei, Hunan, Guangxi, Zhejiang, Yunnan, Fujian, Guizhou, Jiangxi and Sichuan, and in Taiwan and Japan.

Subspecies
Pingasa alba alba
Pingasa alba albida (Oberthür, 1913) (China: Yunnan, Sichuan)
Pingasa alba brunnescens L. B. Prout, 1913 (Japan, China: Hubei, Hunan, Guangxi, Zhejiang, Fujian, Guizhou, Jiangxi, Sichuan)
Pingasa alba yunnana Chu, 1981 (China: Yunnan)

References

Pseudoterpnini
Moths of Japan
Moths described in 1891
Taxa named by Charles Swinhoe